The National Scout Organization of Thailand (NSOT;) is the national Scouting organization of Thailand. Scouting was founded in Thailand in 1911 and was among the charter members of the World Organization of the Scout Movement in 1922. It is currently regulated by the Scouting Act, BE 2551 (2008). The organization has 828,248 members (as of 2013) and is open to boys and girls.

Early history 

Scouting was first introduced in Thailand as a branch of the Wild Tiger Corps on July 1, 1911 by King Rama VI, who is known as the Father of Thai Scouting. Thailand claims to be the third country in the world to establish Scouting, but it was more likely fourth. King Rama VI brought back the idea of Scouting from Great Britain where he studied. 

Abhai Chandavimol served on the World Scout Committee of the World Organization of the Scout Movement from 1965 to 1971. Five Thais have been honored with the Bronze Wolf, the highest distinction of the World Organization of the Scout Movement, awarded for exceptional services to Scouting. Recipients and the year they received the Bronze Wolf are: Abhai Chandavimol (1971), Chitra Dansuputra (1976), Kong Visudharomn (1980), and Bhethai Amatayakul (1984), and Bhumibol Adulyadej (2006).

Scouting and schools

Although Scouting is part of the school program, especially for grades 6-8, it is not actually mandatory.  Options do exist for participation in other youth programs, such as the Thai Red Cross; however, the vast majority of Thai youth participate in Scouting.  Scouts wear their Scout uniforms to school once a week, though which day of the week is set by the local schools.

Programs 

Thai youth are normally placed in a Scouting program based on the school grade they are in, not their age. These are also open to both boys and girls.

Sea Scouts are supported by the Royal Thai Navy and Air Scouts by the Royal Thai Air Force.

Scout ideals and methods

 Chief Scout: King of Thailand
 King Scout: this award is available to Senior Scouts and is the Thai equivalent of the Eagle Scout award in American Scouting.
 Scout Motto: "Better to die than to lie" (เสียชีพอย่าเสียสัตย์)
 National Scout Day: July 1
 The membership badge of The National Scout Organization of Thailand features the head of a tiger. The country is within the tiger's range. The badge also carries the Scout Motto.

Major events

See also
Girl Guides Association of Thailand
Amphoe Bang Khonthi
World Buddhist Scout Brotherhood
Yongyudh Vajaradul

References

External links 
  
 Scouting in Thailand
 Asia-Pacific Region Scouting
 https://web.archive.org/web/20080724183215/http://www.pinetreeweb.com/left5-4.htm
 Skolta Esperanto-Ligo

National Scout Organization of Thailand
National Scout Organization of Thailand

Youth organizations established in 1911